This is a list of foreign players in the Primera Division, which began league play in 1933. The following players must meet the following criteria:
Have played at least one Primera División game. Players who were signed by Primera División clubs, but only played in lower league, cup and/or international matches, or did not play in any competitive games at all, are not included.
Are considered foreign, i.e., outside Nicaragua, if he is not eligible to play for the Nicaragua national team.

More specifically,
If a player has been capped on international level, the national team is used; if he has been capped by more than one country, the highest level (or the most recent) team is used. These include Nicaragua players with dual citizenship.
If a player has not been capped on international level, his country of birth is used, except those who were born abroad from Nicaragua parents or moved to Nicaragua at a young age, and those who clearly indicated to have switched his nationality to another nation.

Clubs listed are those the player has played at least one Primera División game for. Seasons listed are those the player has played at least one Primera División game in.

In bold: players who have played at least one Primera División game in the current season (2011–12), and the clubs they've played for. They include players who have subsequently left the club, but do not include current players of a Pro League club who have not played a Primera División game in the current season.

In Italics: Players who have represented their national team

Naturalized players 

  Erick Alcázar -  Diriangen FC, Chinandega FC, Deportivo Walter Ferretti
  Daniel Cadena - Deportivo Walter Ferretti
  Luis Fernando Copete - Managua F.C., Deportivo Walter Ferretti
  Mario García - Managua F.C., Deportivo Walter Ferretti, Diriangen FC
   Raul Leguias - Real Esteli F.C., Managua F.C., Deportivo Walter Ferretti
  Elmer Mejia - Real Esteli F.C.
  Darwin Ramírez - VCP Chinandega, Deportivo Ocotal, Deportivo Walter Ferretti, Diriangen FC
  Manuel Rosas - Real Esteli F.C.

Asia – AFC

India 
 Ranvir Singh - Diriangen FC

Japan 
 Kazumichi Ikeda - Juventus Managua
 Masashi Kobari - Chinandega F.C., Real Madriz
 Kohei Tomokiyo - FC San Marcos, Deportivo Walter Ferretti,

Africa - CAF

Equatorial Guinea 
 Niko Kata - Real Esteli

Ghana 
 Joseph Donko - UNAN Managua

Togo 
 Donouvi Blaise - UNAN Managua

South America - CONMEBOL

Argentina 
 Luis Acuna - Real Esteli
 Gabriel Álvarez - Scorpión FC, Diriangen
 Jesús Anrique - Deportivo Jalapa
 Sergio Arzamendia - Diriangen
 Lucio Barroca - Real Esteli F.C.
 Alfredo Batista - FC San Marcos, Xilotepelt
 Juan Berdún - Real Esteli F.C.
 Pablo Rodrigo Barrios -  Masachapa F.C.
 Enzo Brahim - Masachapa/San Francisco
 Rodrigo de Brito - Deportivo Sebaco
 Diego Brutto - Diriangen
 Brian Calabrese - Walter Ferretti
 Diego Campos - Diriangen
 Lucas Carrera - Diriangen
 Lautaro Ceratto - Real Esteli
 Roberto Armando Chanampe - Diriangen, Chinandega FC
 Leandro Figueroa - Walter Ferretti
 Jonatan Brigatti Gomez - Diriangen FC, Chinandega FC
 Néstor Ariel Holweger - Masatepe, FC San Marcos, Deportivo Walter Ferretti, Real Esteli
 Allan Maralles - Juventus Managua
 Lucas Martella - Diriangen
 Allan Marbella Morales - FC San Marcos
 Jorge Moreno - Real Madriz
 Carlos Javier Martino - Masatepe, Scorpión FC, Deportivo Walter Ferretti, Real Madriz, Diriangen FC, FC San Marcos
 Axel Oyeras - Deportivo Sebaco
 Jonathan Pacheco - Diriangen
  Juan Saraví Platero - Bluefields
 Lucas Piccinini - Masatepe, Deportivo Walter Ferretti
 Miguel Angel Pucharella - Diriangen, HYH Sebaco
  Carlos López Quintero - Managua
 Lucas Reynoso - Juventus Managua
 Alvaro Rezzano - Real Esteli
 Juan Sánchez - Deportivo Sebaco
 Víctor Hugo Sánchez - Real Esteli
 Luciano Sanhueza - Managua, Walter Ferretti
 Dante Segovia -  Diriangen
 Hugo Silva - Real Esteli, Diriangen FC, América Managua
 Carlos Tórres - Diriangen FC
 Ricardo Valenzuela - Diriangen FC
 Federico Vasilchick - Managua

Brazil 
 Jefferson Geraldo De Almeida - Real Esteli
 Rafael De Almeida - Walter Ferretti, Juventus Managua
 Ricardo Silva de Almeida - Real Esteli
 Kleber Araujo - VCP Chinandega
 Leandro Barbosa - Managua F.C.
 Rodrigo Bronzatti - Real Esteli
 Marcel Cecel - Real Esteli
 Gabriel Coelho - ART Municipal Jalapa
 Rafael Costa - Real Esteli
 Leandro Da Cruz - Real Esteli
 Clayton Jose da Cunha - Real Esteli, Managua F.C.
 Assad Esteves - Real Esteli
 Vitor Faiska - Real Esteli
 Leonardo Fernandes- Real Esteli
 Douglas de Souza Ferreira - Real Esteli
 Felipe Cristiano Ferreira - Diriangén
 Carlos Conceição Junior - Walter Ferretti
 Alan Kardek - Real Esteli
 David Lazari - Real Esteli
 Cristiano Fernández da Lima - Managua, Walter Ferretti
 Rodrigo Ludke - VCP Chinandega
 Robinson Luiz - Walter Ferretti, Juventus Managua, Diriangén
 Fernando Marques - Real Esteli
 Bruno de Morais  - Walter Ferretti
 Leandro Cruz de Oliveira - Real Esteli
 Lucas Oliviera - Managua F.C.
 Luri Oliveira - Real Esteli
 Pedro Augusto Pedrinho - Walter Ferretti
 Gledson Pereira - UNAN Managua
 Eduardo Praes - Real Esteli
 Jonatas Ribeiro  - Real Esteli
 Jonathan Joaelton Sampaio - Real Esteli
 Maycon Santana  - Walter Ferretti, Juventus Managua, Real Esteli,  Diriangén
 Leandro Teofilo Santos - Real Esteli
 José Vagno Fontes dos Santos -  Real Esteli
 Lucas Dos Santos - Managua F.C.
 Pedro Dos Santos - Walter Ferretti, Diriangén
 Revson Santos  - Real Esteli
 Daniel Da Silva - Real Esteli
 David Da Silva - Walter Ferretti
 Denis Da Silva - VCP Chinandega
 Gabriel Da Silva  - Real Esteli
 Jose Pereira da Silva - Juventus Managua
 Thiago Lima da Silva - Managua F.C.
 Vinicius da Souza - Managua F.C., Real Esteli
 Daniel Venancio - UNAN Managua
 Rafael Vieira - Diriangén, Juventus Managua
 Vitinho  - Real Esteli

Chile 
 Henry Barrientos - Real Esteli
 Héctor Vega - Juventus Managua

Colombia 
 Sebastian Acosta - Real Esteli F.C.
 Yaidero Alberio - Deportivo Walter Ferretti
 Alberto Asprilla - Deportivo Jalapa
 Diego Arismendi - Ocotal
 Josué Ramírez Asprilla - Real Madriz
 Cristian Ortiz Barraza - Real Madriz
 Marlon Barrios - Real Madriz, Managua F.C., Deportivo Walter Ferretti, Chinandega FC
 Miguel Batalla - Ocotal
 Juan Sebastián Bedoya - Deportivo Ocotal
 Ronny Bello - Managua F.C.
 Jorge Betancur - Real Esteli F.C., Juventus Managua
 Deybran Blanco - Juventus Managua
 Cristhian Cabria - Deportivo Ocotal, ART Jalapa
 Erwin Cabrera - Chinandega FC, ART Jalapa
 Brayan Cañate - Chinandega FC
 Deiver Canate - Deportivo Walter Ferretti
 José Antonio Julio Carballo - Real Madriz
 Jose Luis Cassiani - Real Madriz
 Oscar Castillo - Xilotepelt, Managua F.C.
 David Castrillón - Juventus Managua
 Juan Pablo Chacon - Real Esteli F.C.
 Richard Charris - Chinandega FC
 Eder Chaux - Real Esteli F.C.
 Juan Vidal Congo - UNAN Managua
 Lancelott Devenish - Deportivo Ocotal
 Jason Diaz - Deportivo Ocotal
 Yeison Díaz - Juventus Managua
 Jonathan Donado - UNAN Managua
 Luis Fernando Escobar - Managua F.C.
 Jose Estrada - Real Madriz
 Miguel Estrada - Diriangen FC, Real Madriz
 Luis Fernando - Real Esteli F.C.
 Javier Gaitán - Parmalat
 Andres Garzon - ART Jalapa, Real Madriz
 Andres Giraldo - Chinandega FC, Diriangen FC, Managua F.C.
 Ezequiel Góngora - Juventus Managua
 Jesus Graizabal - Chinandega FC
 Jesus Guerrero - Real Madriz, Deportivo Ocotal, Diriangen FC, UNAN Managua
 Emiro Manuel Gomez - Deportivo Ocotal
 Evaristo González - Deportivo Sebaco, UNAN Managua, Deportivo Ocotal, ART Municipal Jalapa
 Jose Luis Gonzales - ART Jalapa
 Luiz Fernanado Gonzales - Real Esteli F.C., Managua F.C., Juventus Managua, UNAN Managua
 Devis Gutiérrez - Real Esteli F.C.
 Daniel Henao - Juventus Managua
 John Hernández - UNAN Managua
 Rodrigo Hernández - UNAN Managua, Walter Ferretti
 Johan Hurtado - Chinandega FC
 Ramón Eloy Iriarte  - Real Madriz
 Bryan Leal - Deportivo Sebaco
 Kenverlen López - Ocotal
 Esteban Lozada - Chinandega FC
 Brayan Cantillo Lucumi - Ocotal
 Nelson Maldonado - Ocotal
 Luis Marines - Deportivo Jalapa
 Jorge Marin - Diriangen FC
 Gabriel Martinez -  Real Esteli F.C.
 Edwin Mejia - Diriangen FC
 Brandon Mena - Masachapa/San Francisco, Diriangen FC
 Christian Mena - Diriangen FC
 José Mendoza - Chinandega FC
 Miguel Potes Mina - Diriangen
 Bryan Mojica - Real Madriz
 Miguel Montalvo - Ocotal
 Jamilton Moreno - Real Madriz
 Carlos Mosquera - Masachapa/San Francisco, Deportivo Las Sabanas, Junior de Managua
 Jhon Mosquera - Diriangen
 Jonathan Mosquera - Real Esteli
 Alexander Trimiñio Motta - Ocotal
 Oscar Movil -  Real Esteli
 Eder Munive - Walter Ferretti
 Juan David Muriel - Managua F.C.
 Luis Murillo - UNAN Managua
 Aldair Niño - Ocotal
 Raúl Nomesque - Masachapa/San Francisco
 Kevin Obregón - Juventus Managua
 Jairo Olivares - Chinandega FC
 Jefreg Javier Olivero -  Real Madriz
 Cristian Ortega - Nandasmo
 Juan Esteban Ospina - Juventus Managua
 Ronaldo Pabon - ART Municipal Jalapa
 Jorge Vargas Palacio - Diriangen FC
 Anderson Palacios - Managua F.C., Juventus Managua
 Oscar Castillo Palomino - UNAN Managua, Managua F.C.
 David Pinilla - ART Municipal Jalapa
 Freider Mattos Pombo - UNAN Managua
 Jafet Del Portillo - Ocotal, ART Municipal Jalapa
 Alexander Quiñonez - Real Madriz
 Camilo Quiñonez - ART Jalapa, Nandasmo, Diriangen FC
 Duver Quinonez - Chinandega FC
 Nicolas Quinonez - Real Madriz
 Ronald Quintero - Real Esteli F.C., Juventus Managua
 Andres Camilo Ramirez - Real Esteli F.C.
 German Arias Ramirez -  Real Madriz
 Gustavo Reyes - Chinandega FC
 Maykel Reyes - Walter Ferretti
 Juan Davis Restrepo - Chinandega FC
 Jorge Rivas - Deportivo Ocotal
 Yosimar Rivera - Deportivo Walter Ferretti, Chinandega FC
 Christian Rodriguez - Chinandega FC
 Juan Camilio Rodriguez - Walter Ferretti
 Jose Luis Rodríguez - Walter Ferretti, Diriangen FC
 Rodrigo Rodriguez - UNAN Managua
 Willer Alexander Rodriguez - Nandasmo
 Pedro de la Rosa - Chinandega FC
 Carlos William Rovira - UNAN Managua
 Johnni Saavedra - Diriangen FC
 Yilmar Salas - Nandasmo
 Guillermo Sierra - Real Esteli
 Andrés Solarte - Deportivo Sebaco
 Esteban Tapia - Ocotal
 Ornaldo José Torre - Real Madriz
 Alonso Umaña - Chinandega FC
 Ramon Uriarte - Real Madriz
 Juan Diego Uribe - UNAN Managua, Juventus Managua
 Armando Valdez - Managua F.C., Diriangen FC, Real Madriz, Juventus Managua
 Jafeth Kaleth Valencia - Real Madriz
 Jesus Valencia - Real Esteli F.C.
 Jerney Vente - Ocotal
 Yeiner Marcelo Vivas - ART Municipal Jalapa
 Bryan Viveros - Real Madriz

Paraguay 
 Ever Benítez - UNAN Managua
 Ramón Ferreira - Chinandega
 Jorge Darío Florentín - Deportivo Sebaco
  Marcos González - Managua
 Herber Grijalva - Diriangen
 Javier Haedo - Chinandega
 Fernando Insaurralde - Juventus Managua
 Francisco Miranda - Managua
 Alexander Moreno - Juventus Managua

Peru 
 Baru - Real Esteli F.C.
 Patrick Alca - Real Esteli F.C.
 Eder Ccahua - Deportivo Masaya FC
 Julio Rosales - Juventus Managua FC

Uruguay 
 Fernando Alvez - Real Esteli
 Gonzalo Ancheta - Walter Ferretti
 Sebastián Borba - Real Esteli
 Álvaro Brum - Real Esteli
 Bernardo Laureiro - Walter Ferretti, Diriangen, ART Municipal Jalapa
 Miguel Ángel Lavié - Real Esteli
 Nicolas Martinez - Diriangen
 Adrian Moura - Diriangen
 Gastón Pagan - Real Esteli
 Lucas Rodríguez - Real Esteli
 Mauro Rodríguez - Real Esteli
 Richard Rodríguez - Real Esteli
 Paulo Ortiz - Real Esteli
 Rodrigo Valiente - Real Esteli, Walter Ferretti
 Gabriel Mirazo Villar - Real Esteli
 Javier Vitavar - Real Esteli

Venezuela 
 Miguel Leonardo Sosa González - Deportivo Sebaco, HYH Sebaco
 Yitson Lameda - Deportivo Ocotal
 Edward Morillo - Managua F.C., Real Madriz
 Karim Nasser - Real Madriz
 Hermes Palomino - Managua F.C.
 Genlis Piñero - Managua F.C.

North & Central America, Caribbean - CONCACAF

Canada 
 Joshua Lemus - Diriangen FC
 Saul Tyler Varela Fragoso - Diriangen FC

Costa Rica 
 Kevin Arrieta - Diriangen
 Sebastián Barquero - HYH Sebaco
 Johan Bonilla - Diriangen
 Marco “El Tico” Carrión - Diriangen
 Kenneth Carvajal - Juventus Managua
 Eduardo “El Flaco” Chavarría - Diriangen
 Allan Chavez - Diriangen
 Yeison Esquivel - Diriangen
 Heriberto “La Chamba” Gómez - Diriangen FC
 Alfonso Martínez - Diriangen
 Andrés Mendoza - Diriangen
 Josué Meneses - Diriangen
 Henry Niño - Diriangen
 Wendell Porras - Diriangen
 Francisco Rodriguez- Diriangen
 Luis Rodriguez - Diriangen
 Francisco “Chico Mambo” Romero  - Diriangen
 Brandon Salazar - Diriangen
 Eduardo Salas - Real Madriz
 Byron Segura - Diriangen
 Gilberth Sequeira - Xilotepelt
 Rodrigo el osito Solano - [[[Diriangen FC|Diriangen]]
 Randal Torres - Parmalat
 Oscar Urróz - Managua
 Andrés Arce Versi - Juventus Managua
 Luis Villaforte - Parmalat
 Harold Villalobos - Diriangen

Cuba 
 Sandro Cutino - Managua

El Salvador 
 Manuel Alas  - Deportivo Jalapa
 René Hernández Alvarez - Real Esteli F.C.
 Luis Corea - Real Esteli F.C.
 René Domínguez - Real Esteli F.C.
 Imas Danilo - Deportivo Jalapa
 Alirio Flores - Diriangen FC
 Armando “El Negro” Henríquez - Diriangen FC
 Nahun Martínez - Real Madriz
 Luis Mario “El Mesié” Orellana - Diriangen FC
 Guillermo Ortiz - Diriangen FC
 Miguel Ángel Riquelme - Real Esteli F.C.
 Edwin Samayoa - Chinandega F.C.
 Jorge Valle - Deportivo Walter Ferretti
 Carlos Zapata - Diriangen FC
 Carlos Zepeda - Diriangen FC

Guatemala 
 Jonathon Angelo Castillo - Juventus Managua
 Franklin Garcia - UNAN Managua

Honduras 
 Juan Acevedo - Chinandega FC
  Grodbin Antonio Benítez Aguilar - Real Madriz
 Marel Álvarez -  Real Madriz, Managua
 Rolín Álvarez  - Ocotal
 Roger Alvarez - Real Esteli, FC San Marcos
 Selvin Alvarez - Real Esteli
 Arlis Andino - Diriangén FC, ART Municipal Jalapa
 Lisandro Andino - Managua
 Magdaleno Andino - Deportivo Jalapa
 Jeffry Araica - Managua
 Chimilio Aviles - Real Madriz
 Jorge Balladares - Chinandega FC
 Adin Barahona - Real Madriz
 Christian Batiz - Managua F.C., Ocotal
 Ramon Benedit - Real Madriz
 Jorge Valentín Bodden - Walter Ferretti
 Mario Borja - ART Jalapa
 Heberth Cabrera - Diriangen FC, Managua F.C., UNAN Managua, Juventus Managua
 Víctor Carrasco - América Managua, Masatepe, FC San Marcos, Xilotepelt, Walter Ferretti, Juventus Managua
 Bryan Castillo - Managua
 Edwin Castillo - Real Madriz
 Victor Castillo - Diriangen
 Edwin Castro - Real Madriz
 Kevin Castro - Real Madriz
 Richart Misael Cerna - Real Madriz
 Grevin Antonio Cerrato - Real Madriz
 Cesar Colon - Real Esteli
 Rony Fabricio Colon -  Real Madriz, Juventus Managua
 Jaime Crisanti - Ocotal, Chinandega FC
 Jose Armando Cruz - Walter Ferretti, Juventus Managua, Diriangen
 Marlon Cruz - Ocotal
 Walter Cruz - Managua
 Abel Dominguez - Juventus Managua
 Carlos Daniel Duran - Ocotal
 Leonel Escoto - Diriangen, ART Municipal Jalapa
 Javier Espinales - ART Jalapa
 Cristhian Euseda - Juventus Managua
 Edgard Figueroa - Real Esteli
 Eugenio Dolmo Flores - Real Esteli
 Wilson Flores - Diriangen
 Mario Giron - Walter Ferretti
 Carlos Alfredo Gonzalez - Real Madriz
 Keysi Guerreo - FC San Marcos, Managua
 Darwin Ambrocio Guity - Walter Ferretti, Juventus Managua, Managua
 Allan Gutiérrez - Chinandega FC, Walter Ferretti, UNAN Managua, Ocotal
 Eduardo Hernández - Diriangen
 Jorge Hernandez - Juventus Managua
 Marlon Hernández - Masatepe
 Christian Izaguirre - Chinandega FC
 Jonathan Juárez - Real Madriz, Ocotal
 Oscar Lagos'' - Real Esteli
 Israel Lainez - Juventus Managua
 Renan Lalin - Chinandega FC, UNAN Managua
 Marvin Lamber - Fox Villa
 Victor Lozano - Walter Ferretti
 Byron Maradiaga - Ocotal
 Luis Maradiaga - Ocotal, ART Municipal Jalapa
 Marlon Marcia - Walter Ferretti
 Gerson Martinez - Diriangen
 Jorge Martínez  - América Managua, Walter Ferretti
 Dixon Mauricio - Ocotal
 Allan Medina - ART Municipal Jalapa
 Ricardo Medina - Ocotal
 Alejandro Mejía - Masatepe, FC San Marcos, Walter Ferretti
 Howall Mejia - Diriangen
 Jose Javier Mejia - Deportivo Ocotal
 Pedro Melendez - Real Madriz
 Julio Cesar Molina - Ocotal
 Víctor Norales - Managua F.C., Real Madriz, Chinandega FC
 Gabriel Ortiz - Ocotal
 José Luis Palacios - Real Madriz
 Samuel Padilla - Deportivo Jalapa, Masatepe, Walter Ferretti, Chinandega FC, Parmalat
 Santiago Paredes - Real Madriz
 Jarel Puerto -  Chinandega FC
 Ever Rodríguez - Masachapa/San Francisco
 Marcos Rivera - Ocotal
 Erlyn Ruíz - Ocotal, ART Jalapa, Real Madriz
 Misael Ruíz  - Ocotal
 Cesar Salandia - Masatepe, FC San Marcos, Walter Ferretti, Ocotal,  Juventus Managua
 Byron Jose Sauceda - América Managua
 Erick Sierra -  Ocotal, Managua
 Jairo Sosa - Real Madriz
 Jonathan Suárez -  Deportivo Ocotal
 Channel Suazo - Real Esteli, ART Municipal Jalapa
 Juan Jose Tablada - Real Esteli, Managua,  Ocotal, Juventus Managua, ART Municipal Jalapa
 Jorge Valladares -  Ocotal
 José Francisco Valladares - Ocotal
 Luis Valladares - Walter Ferretti, Real Madriz
 Nerlin Vallejos - Ocotal
 Marlin Bonillas Ibarra
 Michael Williams -  Ocotal, UNAN Managua
 Mitchel Williams - Walter Ferretti
 Rudy Williams -  Juventus Managua
 Bryan Zuninga - ART Municipal Jalapa, HYH Sebaco

Jamaica 
 Dennis Thompson - Diriangen

Mexico 
 Gerardo Aguilar - Real Esteli F.C.
 Bernard Amaya - América Managua
 Jesús Anrriquez - Deportivo Jalapa
 Ernesto Benítez - Masachapa/San Francisco
 Luis Carbajal - Junior de Managua
 Victor Adrian Cardoso - Xilotepelt, Flor de Caña
 Diego Casas - Walter Ferretti
 Mauricio Castañeda  - Real Madriz
 Carlos Castro - Walter Ferretti
 Edson Contreras - Junior de Managua
 Fidel Cortés - Deportivo Jalapa
 Diego de la Cruz - Juventus Managua
 Giovanni Cuella - Deportivo Jalapa
 Rogelio Espinoza - Junior de Managua
 Carlos Félix - Juventus Managua
 José Antonio Flores - Real Esteli F.C., Managua F.C.
 Carlos Felix Gámez - Managua F.C., Juventus Managua
 Alberto Garcia - Fox Villa
 Eder García - ART Jalapa
 Daniel González - ART Jalapa
 Bernardo Gradilla - Diriangen, Juventus Managua
 Marco Granados - Real Esteli
 Taufic Guarch - Walter Ferretti
 Edgard Hernández - Deportivo Ocotal, ART Jalapa
 Jesús Leal - Real Esteli
 Emilio López- Real Esteli F.C.
 Juan Carlos López - Real Esteli F.C.
 Edder Mondragón - Real Madriz, ART Jalapa
 Yilberto Morales - Deportivo Jalapa, Diriangen F.C.
 Segio Napoles - Walter Ferretti
 Ramon Pedrozo - Real Madriz, FC San Marcos
 Jaime Romo - - Xilotepelt, Chinandega FC, Fox Villa
 Eduardo Rosas - Deportivo Ocotal
 Roel Salinas -Fox Villa
 Julio Sotelo - América Managua
 Israel Taboada - Deportivo Jalapa
 Carlos Torres - Diriangen FC
 Gregorio Torres - Real Esteli F.C.
 Fernando Villalpando - Walter Ferretti
 Hugo Zambrano - Fox Villa

Panama 
 Mauro Allen - FC San Marcos, Deportivo Ocotal
 Samuel Kerr - Chinandega FC
 Moises Leguias - América Managua, Juventus Managua, FC San Marcos
 Gerardo Negrete - Deportivo Ocotal
 Luis Martínez Rangel - UNAN Managua,  Deportivo Ocotal
 Julio Pastor Ruiz - Real Madriz
 Álvaro Salazar - Xilotepelt
 Luis Sinclair - Chinandega FC
 George Tingline - Chinandega FC, UNAN Managua
 Rodolfo Forbes - Managua

United States 
 Arturo Barragan - Diriangen FC

Europe - UEFA
Italy 
 Giacomo Ratto - UNAN Managua

Russia 
 Nikita Sodlochenko - Deportivo Walter Ferretti

Spain 
 Francisco Perez Baho - Real Estel
 Arán Pazos Balado - Managua
 Alberto Heredia Ceballos - Real Esteli F.C.
 Santiago Otero Diaz - Real Estel
 Alex Expósito - Diriangén FC
 Pablo Gállego''' - Real Estel, Managua
  Bidari Garcia - Real Estel
 Diego Pelaez - Managua
 Alex Piache - Fox Villa
 Daniel Olcina - Diriangén FC

Sweden 
 Niclas Elving - Deportivo Walter Ferretti
 Jonas Matersson - Real Esteli F.C.

Notes

External links
 https://futbolnica.net/2021/10/26/top-5-los-fichajes-mas-exoticos-en-nicaragua/
 https://web.archive.org/web/20120404121402/http://archivo.laprensa.com.ni/archivo/2002/enero/23/deportes/deportes-20020123-03.html

players
 
Association football player non-biographical articles